The men's sabre was one of eight fencing events on the fencing at the 1984 Summer Olympics programme. It was the twentieth appearance of the event. The competition was held from August 3 to 4, 1984. 33 fencers from 16 nations competed. Nations had been limited to three fencers each since 1928. The event was won by Jean-François Lamour of France, the nation's first victory in the event since 1900 (and second overall). Marco Marin of Italy took silver and Peter Westbrook of the United States took bronze. It was the first medal in the event in many Games for each of the three nations since 1964 for France, since 1960 for Italy, and since 1904 for the United States), as the men's sabre competitions had been dominated by Hungary and the Soviet Union. With both of those nations boycotting the 1984 Games, other nations had an opportunity to win medals in the sabre.

Background

This was the 20th appearance of the event, which is the only fencing event to have been held at every Summer Olympics. None of the finalists from 1980 returned; five of the six were from boycotting countries and Michele Maffei (at age 38) was no longer on the Italian team. All three of the world champions since the 1980 Games had been from boycotting nations as well. The favorite was rising French star Jean-François Lamour, a seven-time French champion who had never placed better than fifth in a global championship—though this time he would be facing Italians and Romanians rather than Soviets and Hungarians.

The People's Republic of China, Monaco, and the Virgin Islands each made their debut in the men's sabre. Italy made its 18th appearance in the event, most of any nation, having missed the inaugural 1896 event and the 1904 Olympics.

Competition format

The 1984 tournament used a three-phase format similar to that of 1976 and 1980, though the final phase was different.

The first phase was a multi-round round-robin pool play format; each fencer in a pool faced each other fencer in that pool once. There were three pool rounds: 
 The first round had 6 pools of 5 or 6 fencers each, with the top 5 in each pool advancing.
 The second round had 6 pools of 5 fencers each, with the top 4 in each pool advancing.
 The third round had 4 pools of 6 fencers each, with the top 4 in each pool advancing.

The second phase was a truncated double-elimination tournament. Four fencers advanced to the final round through the winners brackets and four more advanced via the repechage.

The final phase was a single elimination tournament with a bronze medal match. (This was changed from a 6-man final round-robin pool in previous years.)

Bouts in the round-robin pools were to 5 touches; bouts in the double-elimination and final rounds were to 10 touches.

Schedule

All times are Pacific Daylight Time (UTC-7)

Results

Round 1

Round 1 Pool A

Round 1 Pool B

Round 1 Pool C

Round 1 Pool D

Round 1 Pool E 

Allam did not start.

Round 1 Pool F 

Ko did not start.

Round 2

Round 2 Pool A

Round 2 Pool B

Round 2 Pool C

Round 2 Pool D

Round 2 Pool E

Round 2 Pool F

Round 3

Round 3 Pool A

Round 3 Pool B

Round 3 Pool C

Round 3 Pool D

Double elimination rounds

Winners brackets

Winners group 1

Winners group 2

Winners group 3

Winners group 4

Losers brackets

Losers group 1

Losers group 2

Losers group 3

Losers group 4

Final round

Final classification

References

Sabre men
Men's events at the 1984 Summer Olympics